Valeriy Palamarchuk (born 11 August 1963) is former Ukrainian association footballer.

Career
In 1983 Palamarchuk took part in the Summer Spartakiad of the Peoples of the USSR in the team of Ukrainian SSR. He also participated in the 1983 FIFA World Youth Championship for the Soviet team.

References

External links
 
 

1963 births
Living people
Sportspeople from Lviv
Soviet footballers
Ukrainian footballers
Ukrainian expatriate footballers
Expatriate footballers in Poland
Expatriate footballers in Belarus
FC Dynamo Kyiv players
FC Nyva Vinnytsia players
FC Chornomorets Odesa players
FC CSKA Kyiv players
FC Elektrometalurh-NZF Nikopol players
FC Dinamo Minsk players
MFC Mykolaiv players
FC Karpaty Lviv players
Polonia Warsaw players
NK Veres Rivne players
FC Torpedo Mogilev players
FC Bucha players
FC Yednist Plysky players
Ukrainian football managers
Association football goalkeepers